Je'Kel Reshard Foster (born July 22, 1983) is an American professional basketball player for Benfica do Libolo of the BIC Basket.

College
Foster began his studies at Howard Junior College in Big Spring, Texas. After a year, his basketball coach Chris Jans joined the Chipola Junior College at Marianna, Florida and took Foster with him. For further studies Foster then switched to the Ohio State University, where he played for the university team Buckeyes in the NCAA.

Professional career 
After going undrafted in the 2006 NBA draft, he signed with EnBW Ludwigsburg of the German Bundesliga for the 2006–07 season.

For the 2007–08 season he signed with Paris-Levallois of the French LNB Pro A. From 2008 to 2010 he played with EWE Baskets Oldenburg. In July 2010, he signed with Triboldi Cremona of Italy for the 2010–11 season.

In July 2011, he signed with Bayern Munich. He played there till August 2012, when he was cut because of disciplinary reasons.

In September 2012, he signed with Spirou Charleroi of Belgium. He played there till December when he goes to Alba Berlin where he was signed a week after Alba lost point guard, Vule Avdalović, to a season-ending knee injury.

In October 2013, he signed with JSF Nanterre. He left them in December 2013. On February 5, 2014, he signed with Sidigas Avellino of Italy for the rest of the season.

On November 21, 2014, Foster signed with Homenetmen Beirut of Lebanon. However, he never played for the Lebanese club. On January 13, 2015, he signed with Medi Bayreuth of Germany for the rest of the season.

On December 9, 2015, he signed with Guaros de Lara of the Venezuelan LPB. On March 1, 2016, he signed with ICL Manresa of Spain for the rest of the 2015–16 ACB season.

On September 8, 2016, Foster signed in Angola with C.R.D. Libolo of the BIC Basket.

References

External links
 Euroleague.net profile
 Eurobasket.com profile
 Lega Basket Serie A profile

1983 births
Living people
African-American basketball players
Alba Berlin players
American expatriate basketball people in Angola
American expatriate basketball people in Belgium
American expatriate basketball people in France
American expatriate basketball people in Germany
American expatriate basketball people in Italy
American expatriate basketball people in Spain
American expatriate basketball people in Venezuela
American men's basketball players
Basketball players from Mississippi
Bàsquet Manresa players
C.R.D. Libolo basketball players
Chipola Indians men's basketball players
EWE Baskets Oldenburg players
FC Bayern Munich basketball players
Guaros de Lara (basketball) players
Howard Hawks men's basketball players
Liga ACB players
Medi Bayreuth players
Riesen Ludwigsburg players
Nanterre 92 players
Ohio State Buckeyes men's basketball players
Metropolitans 92 players
Point guards
S.S. Felice Scandone players
Shooting guards
Spirou Charleroi players
Sportspeople from Natchez, Mississippi
Vanoli Cremona players
21st-century African-American sportspeople
20th-century African-American people